Barrisca is a genus of spiders in the family Trechaleidae. It was first described in 1936 by Chamberlin & Ivie. , it contains 2 species.

References

Trechaleidae
Araneomorphae genera
Spiders of Central America
Spiders of South America